The 2021–22 Admiral Bet Basketball League of Serbia was the 16th season of the Basketball League of Serbia, the top-tier professional basketball league in Serbia. Also, it is the 78th national championship played by Serbian clubs inclusive of the nation's previous incarnations as Yugoslavia and Serbia & Montenegro.

Teams 
A total of 21 teams participated in the 2021–22 Basketball League of Serbia as confirmed by the Basketball Federation of Serbia on 30 June 2021. Crvena zvezda mts was the defending champion.

Distribution
The following is the access list for this season.

Promotion and relegation 
 Teams promoted from the Second League
 Zdravlje Leskovac
 Slodes SoccerBet

 Teams relegated to the Second League
 Napredak JKP
 Pirot

Venues and locations

First League
The 2021–22 First League season started on 2 October 2021.

Personnel and sponsorship

Coaching changes

Standings

SuperLeague

The Playoffs are the second stage of the 2021–22 Serbian League season. The Super League was canceled due to ABA League schedule conflict and the qualified teams will playe in the Playoffs.

On 9 June 2022, Partizan announced withdrawal from the 2022 Serbian League playoffs following numerous incidents in the 2022 ABA League Finals.

Qualified teams

Personnel and sponsorship

Coaching changes

SuperLeague Playoffs
Teams involved:
 2 lowest-placed Serbian teams from the Adriatic League: Borac, Mega Mozzart
 6 highest-placed teams from the First League: Zlatibor, Sloga, Vojvodina, Mladost MaxBet, Dynamic VIP PAY, Sloboda

SuperLeague Final Four
Teams involved:
 3 highest-placed Serbian teams from the First ABA League: Crvena zvezda mts, Partizan NIS (withdraw), FMP Meridian
 winner of the SuperLeague Playoffs: Mega Mozzart

See also
List of current Basketball League of Serbia team rosters
2021–22 Second Men's League of Serbia (basketball)
2021–22 Radivoj Korać Cup
2021–22 Basketball Cup of Serbia
2021–22 ABA League First Division
2021–22 ABA League Second Division
2021–22 First Women's Basketball League of Serbia
2021–22 KK Crvena zvezda season
2021–22 KK Partizan season

References

External links
 
 League at srbijasport.net

Basketball League of Serbia seasons
Serbia
Basketball